Grinderman 2 is the second and final studio album by alternative rock band Grinderman, a side project of Nick Cave and the Bad Seeds, released on 13 September 2010 on Mute Records in the United Kingdom and ANTI- in the United States.

At the ARIA Music Awards of 2011, the album was nominated for ARIA Award for Best Adult Alternative Album.

Background and production
Grinderman had been put on hold due to the members' involvement on Nick Cave and The Bad Seeds' fourteenth studio album, Dig, Lazarus, Dig!!!, in 2008. After the Nick Cave and the Bad Seeds summer tour in 2008, the band began recording the album in various studios throughout London. Speaking to XFM, Cave noted that the album "will feature a totally different sound" and plan to "do it a more serious way this time"; he remarked that he did not plan for the album to receive commercial success.

Recording was completed in August 2009—a year after the original sessions—production was completed in April 2010 at Seedy Underbelly in Los Angeles, and the album was produced by Nick Launay, a friend of the band, who had also produced Grinderman's self-titled debut, with additional production by the members of the band. In an interview with The Quietus in September 2009, Warren Ellis confirmed that Grinderman 2 was completed. Ellis also described the album as "like stoner rock meets Sly Stone via Amon Düül", "very diverse", and "psychedelic." The album was released in September 2010, in a regular and a deluxe edition, the latter containing a 52-page booklet (illustrations by Ilinca Höpfner) and a poster (photography by Polly Borland).

Singles
The album's first single, "Heathen Child," was released in September 2010. The music video was directed by long-time collaborator John Hillcoat. "Worm Tamer", the second single, was released on 22 November. The music video was directed by Iain Forsyth and Jane Pollard.

Critical reception

Grinderman 2 received mostly positive reviews, with some critics finding the album superior to its predecessor, Grinderman, and holds an 83 score on Metacritic, denoting "universal acclaim." Thom Jurek of AllMusic said it was a "more polished and studied affair than its predecessor" and "more sonically adventurous" while still being a "white-hot rock and roll record." It has been described as "full of nightmares, but nightmares worth repeating." Garry Mulholland of BBC Music said that Grinderman 2 had a sound, influenced as much by 60s garage punk and droning Krautrock as the blues."

Track listing

The iTunes LP will also include bonus videos of "Heathen Child", seven trailers for the album, directed by John Hillcoat and Ilinca Hoepfner and a digital booklet complete with lyrics.

Personnel
Grinderman
Martyn Casey – bass guitar, acoustic guitar, backing vocals, assistant production
Nick Cave – vocals, electric guitar, organ, piano, art direction, assistant production
Warren Ellis – acoustic guitar, viola, violin, electric bouzouki, electric mandolin, backing vocals, assistant production
Jim Sclavunos – drums, percussion, backing vocals, assistant production

Production personnel
Russell Fawkus – assistant production (at Assault & Battery 2)
David "Saxon" Greenep – assistant production (at State of the Ark)
Tom Hough – assistant production (at State of the Ark)
Nick Launay – production, engineering
Kevin Paul – assistant production

Art personnel
Polly Borland – photography
Tom Hingston – art direction
Ilinca Höpfner – illustration

Chart positions

Weekly charts

Year-end charts

Release history

References

Mute Records albums
Albums produced by Nick Launay
Grinderman albums
Anti- (record label) albums
2010 albums